BNS Bangabandhu is a guided-missile frigate of the Bangladesh Navy. She is currently based at Chattogram, serving with the Commodore Commanding BN Flotilla (COMBAN). She is currently the only frigate of the Bangladesh Navy armed with ASW torpedo and gun based CIWS.

Armament

In April 2018, Bangladesh Navy issued a tender for replacing two 40 mm Fast Forty guns on board the ship with new 40 mm twin-barrel  gun system.

Career
Bangabandhu was named after Bangladesh's founding father, Sheikh Mujibur Rahman, who is popularly called Bangabandhu (Friend of Bengal). The ship was ordered in March 1998. She was laid down on 12 May 1999 at Daewoo Shipbuilding & Marine Engineering, Republic of Korea. She was launched on 29 August 2000, and commissioned on 20 June 2001.

In 2007 she was recommissioned again under a new name, as BNS Khalid Bin Walid. Later on in 2009 she was renamed BNS Bangabandhu.

The ship participated in Exercise Ferocious Falcon, a multinational crisis management exercise, held at Doha, Qatar in November 2012. While transiting to the exercise, the frigate visited the port of Kochi, India. The ship took part in Cooperation Afloat Readiness and Training(CARAT), an annual bilateral exercise with United States Navy, from 2011 to 2015.

On 29 August 2013, the ship received the National Standard.

In 2014, Malaysia Airlines Flight 370, a 777-200ER, went missing while in flight. Due to the possibility of finding the wreckage in the Bay of Bengal, Bangabandhu, along with the frigate , joined the search operation in the region.

On 31 May 2016, she started for Colombo, Sri Lanka with 150 tonnes of relief for the victims of the floods and landslides caused by Cyclone Roanu. The relief included drugs, water purifying machines, pure drinking water, tents, food items and generators. She also joined the rescue efforts there.

The ship left for Qatar on 22 February 2018 to take part in 6th Doha International Maritime Exhibition and Conference (DIMDEX-2018) to be held from 12  to 14 March 2018. She paid goodwill visits to Mumbai port, in India, from 2 to 5 March 2018 and to Colombo port in Sri Lanka from 22 to 25 March 2018. On 29 March 2018, she returned to her homeport, Chattogram.

See also
 List of active ships of the Bangladesh Navy

References and notes

External links

 Photo from Google earth

 

Ships built by Daewoo Shipbuilding & Marine Engineering
Frigates of the Bangladesh Navy
Ulsan-class frigates of the Bangladesh Navy
2000 ships
Memorials to Sheikh Mujibur Rahman
Ships of the Bangladesh Navy